Loyd Alvie Lowe (August 10, 1928 - September 28, 2019) was an American football defensive back who played for the Chicago Bears. He played college football at University of North Texas after attending Mart High School in Mart, Texas. He is a member of the North Texas Mean Green Hall of Fame.

References

1928 births
2019 deaths
American football defensive backs
North Texas Mean Green football players
Chicago Bears players
Players of American football from Texas
People from Limestone County, Texas